The Salem Cadets were from Salem, Massachusetts that served in the Union Army between May 26 and October 11, 1862, during the American Civil War. The unit consisted of 123 enlisted men under the command of Major John L. Marks, and six other officers. Their only duty was to serve at Fort Warren, Boston Harbor. They lost one soldier to disease and was mustered out on October 11, 1862.

References

Bibliography 
 Adjutant-General (1868). Massachusetts Volunteers. Wright & Potter State Printers, Boston, Massachusetts.
 Osborn, Francis Augustus (2004). Civil War Regiments From Massachusetts. eBookOnDisk.com Pensacola, Florida. .

Units and formations of the Union Army from Massachusetts
Military units and formations established in 1862
Military units and formations disestablished in 1862
1862 establishments in Massachusetts